A Woman Rebels is a 1936 American historical drama film adapted from the 1930 novel Portrait of a Rebel by Netta Syrett and starring Katharine Hepburn as Pamela Thistlewaite, who rebels against the social mores of Victorian England. The film was directed by Mark Sandrich; it was the film debut of Van Heflin, and the second last film of David Manners.

Hepburn's performance as the defiant young woman is considered by many critics the epitome of her feminist characterizations of the 1930s.

Plot
In Victorian London, Pamela defies her autocratic father (Donald Crisp), and has a baby out of wedlock with her lover, Gerald Waring Gaythorne (Van Heflin, in his screen debut).  Pamela's pregnant sister Flora (Elizabeth Allan) hears of the death of her young husband, faints, hurting herself, and dies. Pamela raises her illegitimate daughter as her niece  and becomes a crusading journalist for women's rights.  Eventually she agrees to marry diplomat Thomas Lane (Herbert Marshall) after being unfairly named as co-respondent in Gaythorne's divorce.

Cast
 Katharine Hepburn as Pamela Thistlewaite
 Herbert Marshall as Thomas Lane
 Elizabeth Allan as Flora Anne Thistlewaite
 Donald Crisp as Judge Byron Thistlewaite
 Doris Dudley as Young Flora
 David Manners as Lieutenant Alan Craig Freeland
 Lucile Watson as Betty Bumble
 Van Heflin as Lord Gerald Waring Gaythorne
 Marilyn Knowlden as Flora (age 9)
 Connie Emerald as Lady Gaythorne  
 Barnett Parker as Lady Gaythorne's Lawyer
 Leonard Carey as Lord Gaythorne's Butler  
 Elspeth Dudgeon as Lord Gaythorne's Maid  
 Eily Malyon as Miss Piper
 Doris Lloyd as Mrs. Seaton 
 Molly Lamont as Young Mother
 Lillian Kemble-Cooper as Lady Rinlake

Reception
With a box office loss estimated at a hefty $222,000 for RKO, this was Hepburn's third flop in a row which contributed to Hepburn being one of the actors labeled "box office poison" in the infamous 1938 advertisement created by Harry Brandt, president of the Independent Theatre Owners of America.

References

External links
 
 
 
 

1936 films
1930s English-language films
American black-and-white films
Films about journalists
Films based on British novels
Films directed by Mark Sandrich
Films set in London
Films set in Italy
Films set in the 19th century
Italian-language American films
American historical drama films
1930s historical drama films
RKO Pictures films
1936 drama films
Films about women in the United Kingdom
1930s feminist films
1930s American films